Chris Vogelzang (born 28 November 1962) is a Dutch business executive who was the CEO of Danske Bank before his resignation was announced on 19 April 2021.

He is a non-executive director of Wolters Kluwer NV since 18 April 2019, and is treasurer of the board of the Rijksmuseum Amsterdam since 1 July 2015.

Vogelzang holds a master's degree in Economics from the University of Groningen, the Netherlands. He studied History and Philosophy at Clark University, USA.

From 1988 to 2000, Vogelzang held various managerial positions in sales, marketing and oil trading with Shell in Rotterdam, London and Uganda. In 2000, he joined ABN AMRO where he was appointed CEO of retail banking in 2002, and CEO of global private banking in 2007. He was a member of the managing board from 2009 to 2017. 

From 2017 to 2019, Vogelzang was senior adviser to the Boston Consulting Group and The Blackstone Group, and in June 2019, was appointed CEO of Danske Bank.

He was a board member of Foam Fotografiemuseum Amsterdam from 2011 to 2015 and treasurer of the Prins Bernhard Cultuurfonds from 2014 to 2019.

He was named as a suspect in a probe in a violation of money laundering at Dutch lender ABN Amro. Vogelzang said that he did not want to get in the way of Danske Bank development. The chairman of the Danske Bank, Karsten Dybvad said "We are very sorry to see Chris Vogelzang leave Danske Bank. He has been instrumental in the initiation of the ongoing transformartion of Danske Bank and the progress and results it has already created."

References

Danske Bank people
1962 births
Living people
University of Groningen alumni
Dutch bankers
Boston Consulting Group people
The Blackstone Group people
Dutch chief executives in the finance industry